The Amherst Islander II is a zero emission ferry boat which will serve Amherst Island  from Millhaven, Ontario  in Lake Ontario, Canada, thus replacing the MV Frontenac II built in 1962. The Amherst Islander II was constructed with another ferry, the MV Wolfe Islander IV, using the same zero emission technology and which will serve between Kingston, Ontario and Wolfe Island.

The Amherst Islander II was launched November 2019, Damen Galați shipyard in Romania. It is currently overwintering at the Picton Terminal, anticipated to be brought into service April 2023. However, apparently its not going to happen this year since there is a dearth of certified marine engineers (one per crew required)

References

Zero-emissions vehicles
Ferries of Ontario
Ships built in Romania